Richard Wilford is a horticulturist with a specialist interest in montane plants and geophytes, who is a collections manager at the Royal Botanic Gardens, Kew. He is on the editorial committee of Curtis's Botanical Magazine and Kew Magazine and a member of the Royal Horticultural Society Daffodil and Tulip Committee.

Publications
Wilford, R. Tulips: Species and Hybrids for the Gardener (2006) Timber Press 

Wilford, R. Alpines, from Mountain to Garden (2010) Royal Botanic Gardens, Kew - Botanical Magazine Monograph 

Ed. Brian Mathew; Boyce. P, Mayo, S., Wilford, R., Bogner, J. Curtis's Botanical Magazine Volume 12, Part 3, August 1995 - devoted to the Araceae ASIN B007J9IX9U

Articles
Wilford, R. (2010). Tropaeolum tricolor. Curtis’s Botanical Magazine 27 (3): 262—267.

References

External links
 author profile at Timber Press
 books presently in print

1964 births
Alumni of the University of Southampton
Living people
Botanists active in Kew Gardens
Kew Gardens